Enteroctopus is an octopus genus whose members are sometimes known as giant octopus.

Etymology 

Description 
Enteroctopus is a genus of generally temperate octopuses. Members of this genus are characterized by their large size and are often known as giant octopuses.  Enteroctopus species have distinct longitudinal wrinkles or folds dorsally and laterally on their bodies. Their heads are distinctly narrower than the mantle width. The hectocotylus of the males in this genus, found on the third right arm, is long and narrow in comparison with other genera in the family Octopodidae, often comprising one-fifth the length of the arm. Octopuses in this genus have large, paddle-like papillae instead of the more conical papillae in other octopus genera.

Species 
Genus Enteroctopus at present consists of four species, tabulated below:

Type species 
E. membranaceus has often been regarded as type species of the genus, not because it was designated as such by Rochebrune and Mabille when they erected the genus, but because it was the first named species in the genus. Robson in his 1929 monograph of octopods regarded E. membranaceus as a species dubium because the original description was insufficient to identify an individual species, the holotype was an immature specimen, and the type specimen no longer existed.

As such, the genus was considered invalid until Hochberg resurrected it in 1998. Hochberg noted that Robson had considered E. membranaceus a junior synonym of E. megalocyathus, the second species assigned to the genus by Rochebrune and Mabille in their 1889 description. Additionally, since Rochebrune and Mabille did not actually assign type status to E. membranaceus, Hochberg concluded that Enteroctopus was indeed a valid genus and transferred type-species status to E. megalocyathus based on his conclusion that E. megalocyathus and E. membranaceus are the same species.

Distribution 

Species in the genus Enteroctopus are restricted to the temperate areas of the Northern and Southern Hemispheres. E. dofleini is the only member of the genus found in the Northern Hemisphere, and also the most widely distributed: It is found from Southern California, along the North Pacific Rim to Japan, including the Okhotsk and Bering Seas. The other three species are found in the Southern Hemisphere; E. megalocyathus occurs on the southeastern coast of South America, E. magnificus on the southwestern coast of Africa from Namibia to Port Elizabeth, South Africa, and E. zealandicus in temperate New Zealand.

Size 
The member of this genus that best embodies the common name "giant octopus" is Enteroctopus dofleini, which holds the record of being the world's largest octopus based on direct measurements of a  individual, weighed live.

See also

Giant squid
Colossal squid
Cephalopod size
Kraken
Lusca

Footnotes

References 

Enteroctopodidae
Taxa named by Jules François Mabille